The 10th Panzer Division is an armoured division of the German Army, part of the Bundeswehr.
Its staff is based at Veitshöchheim. The division is a unit of the German Army's stabilization forces and specializes in conflicts of low intensity.

History 

This division was founded as the 10. Panzerdivision of the new German Army in 1959. Originally only consisting of armoured units, it now also commands Germany's last mountain warfare unit. For this reason the Edelweiss badge has become another commonly used insignia to denote allegiance to this formation. The 10th Panzer Division is a part of Germany's permanent contribution to Eurocorps, the other being the German contribution to the Franco-German Brigade which was subordinate to the division until 2006.

After 1993 troops of this division participated in numerous overseas deployments. Among them were the first out-of-area land deployment operations for the Bundeswehr (in fact of any German military unit after World War II). Troops were deployed to Somalia (UNOSOM II) from 1993 to 1994 and to Bosnia and Herzegovina (IFOR) from 1995 to 1996 and stayed in this country until 1998 (SFOR). Soldiers of the 10th Panzer Division's SFOR contingent were also involved in the Bundeswehrs first combat operation in 1997 (Operation Libelle). In 2000, the 10th Panzer Division deployed more than 8,000 personnel to the Balkans. Between 2002 and 2003, it deployed to various operations in the Balkans and in Afghanistan.

In 2017, the 4th Rapid Deployment Brigade of the Czech Land Forces started to ″work closely″ with the division.

 Structure July 2022 

  10th Panzer Division (10. Panzerdivision), in Veitshöchheim
  12th Panzer Brigade (Panzerbrigade 12), in Cham
  23rd Gebirgsjäger Brigade (Gebirgsjägerbrigade 23), in Bad Reichenhall
  37th Panzergrenadier Brigade (Panzergrenadierbrigade 37), in Frankenberg
  Franco-German Brigade''' (Deutsch-Französische Brigade), in Müllheim (administrative control of the brigade's German units)
  10th Signal Battalion (Fernmeldebataillon 10), in Veitshöchheim (activated 1 April 2021)
  10th Operations Support Battalion (Unterstützungsbataillon Einsatz 10), in Veitshöchheim (Reserve unit)
  131st Artillery Battalion (Artilleriebataillon 131), in Weiden in der Oberpfalz with 16x PzH 2000 155 mm self-propelled howitzers, 8x M270 MLRS multiple rocket launch systems, KZO drones and 2x Euro-Art COBRA counter-battery radars
  345th Artillery Demonstration Battalion (Artillerielehrbataillon 345), in Idar-Oberstein with 24x PzH 2000 155 mm self-propelled howitzers, 8x M270 MLRS multiple rocket launch systems, 12x 120 mm mortars, KZO drones and 2x Euro-Art COBRA counter-battery radars
  905th Engineer Battalion'' (Pionierbataillon 905), in Ingolstadt (Reserve unit)

Geographic Distribution

See also 
 German Army
 Eurocorps

References

External links 
 Official Website of the 10th Panzer Division

Military units and formations established in 1959
10